Philip Zandén (born 23 July 1954) is a Swedish actor. He has appeared in more than 60 films and television shows since 1981. He is the brother of actress Jessica Zandén.

Partial filmography

 Jönssonligan och Dynamit-Harry (1982) - Direktörsassistenten
 Mamma (1982) - Arne
 Ronia, the Robber's Daughter (1984) - Adelsherre
 False as Water (1985) - Jens
 Stilleben (1985) - The young man
 The Mozart Brothers (1986) - Flemming
 Amorosa (1986) - Adolf von Krusenstjerna
 Lethal Film (1988) - Lucho
 Jungfruresan (1988) - Lindqvist
 Nallar och människor (1989) - (voice)
 Codename Coq Rouge (1989) - Appeltoft
 The Guardian Angel (1990) - Jacob
 Riktiga män bär alltid slips (1991) - Felix
 The Boys from St. Petri (1991) - Jacob 'Rosen' Rosenheim
 Freud's Leaving Home (1991) - David Cohen
 Brev til Jonas (1992)
 Dreaming of Rita (1993) - Steff
 Black Harvest (1993) - Isidor Seemann
 Det bli'r i familien (1993) - Jan
 Like It Never Was Before (1995) - Superintendent
 Jomfruene i Riga (1996)
 Sånt är livet (1996) - Stef Bäckman
 Credo (1997) - Inspektøren
 The Prompter (1999) - Tubaisten
 Faithless (2000) - Martin Goldman
 Amatørene (2001) - Iver
 Humørkortstativsælgerens søn (2002) - Staffan
 Open Hearts (2002) - Tommy
 Doxa (2005) - Ingemar
 Den utvalde (2005) - Kjell
 Min frus förste älskare (2006) - Robert
 Moreno and the Silence (2006) - Reinhart
 Suddenly (2006) - Simon
 Beck – Den japanska shungamålningen (2007, TV Series) - Malte Beverin
 Så olika (2009) - Joel Adler
 Retrace (2011) - Steve
 Love Is All You Need (2012) - Male Doctor
 Disciple (2013) - Lotskapten Hallström
 Serena (2014) - Calhoun
 Micke & Veronica (2014) - Tommy
 Under pyramiden (2016) - Arthur Ramsby
 Jag älskar dig - En skilsmässokomedi (2016) - Chefen
 Kungen av Atlantis (2019) - Magnus
 438 dagar (2019) - Carl Bildt

References

External links

1954 births
Living people
20th-century Swedish male actors
21st-century Swedish male actors
Swedish male film actors
Swedish male television actors
Male actors from Stockholm